TS Mitech Żywiec is a football club from Żywiec, Poland. The team started in March 2003 as the women's section of the club Soła Żywiec and played its first season in the II Liga, the then second highest league in Poland. After the first season, the team became independent as TS Mitech Żywiec on 3 July 2004.

Since 2009-10 the team plays in the highest league, the Ekstraliga Kobiet. In its first season the team finished 5th. Ground: Stadium in Radziechowy-Wieprz, (w) Radziechowach (polish).

Current squad

Women's statistics

References

External links 
 

Women's football clubs in Poland
Żywiec
Sport in Silesian Voivodeship
Association football clubs established in 2004
2004 establishments in Poland